St Francis College (SFCC) is a co-educational Catholic day school in  Crestmead in City of Logan, Queensland, Australia. The school was founded in 1988.

Sport
The school currently participates in inter-school sporting competitions in futsal, rugby league, and netball.

Family Groups 
St Francis College has four Family Groups: Jagun, Kurrawa, Wimulli and Yaraay.

The Family Group names were borrowed, with permission, from the languages of the traditional owners of the land covering South East Queensland, the Yugambeh and Yuggera people.

Notable alumni
Nick Cummins - former Australian Rugby Union international and Bachelor Contestant

References

Schools in South East Queensland
Catholic secondary schools in Queensland
Schools in Logan City